Saint Huna of Thorney  was a seventh century priest and hermit. His influence in the Northumbrian and Anglian courts make him an important figure in the Christianisation of Anglo-Saxon England.

Huna was a chaplain for Æthelthryth the daughter of Anna of East Anglia, Queen of Ecgfrith, king of the Northumbrians and the Abbess of Ely and he gave Æthelthryth advice pertaining to salvation and talked to her about the teachings and deeds of the saints. St Huna also conducted her funeral.

After her death, Huna left Ely to become a hermit on an island in the Cambridgeshire Fens. His residence on the island was called Huneia and later known as Honey Hill, or Honey Farm, which is located just outside the town of Chatteris.  Huna was considered a holy man and his grave on the small island was known for producing healing miracles. Later Huna's relics were translated from Chatteris to Thorney, at the time more a collection of hermit cells than a monastic institution.

Huna's feast day is 13 February.

References

External links
 

Medieval English saints
Year of birth unknown
7th-century Christian saints
7th-century births
East Anglian saints
7th-century English clergy
English hermits
English Christian monks
Year of death unknown